A chemical toilet collects human excreta in a holding tank and uses chemicals to minimize odors. They do not require a connection to a water supply and are used in a variety of situations. These toilets are usually, but not always, self-contained and movable. A chemical toilet is structured around a relatively small tank, which needs to be emptied frequently. It is not connected to a hole in the ground (like a pit latrine), nor to a septic tank, nor is it plumbed into a municipal system leading to a sewage treatment plant. When the tank is emptied, the contents are usually pumped into a sanitary sewer or directly to a treatment plant.

The portable toilets used on construction sites and at large gatherings such as music festivals are well-known types of chemical toilet. As they are usually used for short periods and because of their high prices, they are mostly rented rather than bought, often including servicing and cleaning. A simpler type of chemical toilet may be used in travel trailers (caravans) and on small boats.

Many chemical toilets use a blue dye in the bowl water. In the past, disinfection was generally carried out by mixing formaldehyde, bleach, or similar chemicals with the toilet water when flushed. Modern formulations are nitrate-based and work biologically.

Names

Chemical toilets are a type of portable toilet and are also known by various tradenames, such as Port-a-John and Porta-Potty (American English), Portaloo (British English), honey bucket, or sanican. The last two are the names of companies and "Portaloo" is a British and European Community registered trade mark.

Designs
Chemical toilets are often used as a temporary solution, for example on construction sites or large gatherings, because of their durability and convenience. Most chemical toilets have black open-front U-shaped toilet seats with a cover. They are often constructed out of lightweight molded plastic.

While the units are typically free-standing structures, their stability is augmented by the weight of the waste tank, which usually contains an empty liquid disinfectant dispenser and deodorizer. Some include both a seated toilet and a urinal. Most include lockable doors, ventilation near the top, and a vent pipe for the holding tank. When wind is blowing over the vent pipe it creates a low pressure area sucking the odor out. Leaving the toilet lid open will reverse the flow of the venting of the tank.

Typical specifications:

 Total Weight: 
 Total Width: 
 Total Depth: 
 Total Height: 
 Door Height: 
 Door Width:

Chemicals
Portable chemical toilets typically use a mixture of several different chemicals in the holding tank.

A blue dye is added to conceal the contents of the tank from the user, as well as to provide a visual indicator of capacity. When enough urine and/or feces (yellow to brown) are deposited, the overall mixture takes on a green color which indicates that the tank is full, and should be emptied.

Fragrances and associated surfactants are usually included.

Biocides are added in an effort to control odor by suppressing microbial growth (particularly of gram-positive bacteria). Milder forms include ethanol and quaternary ammonium compounds in low concentration.

A formaldehyde based chemical was used for this purpose in the past, but environmental and health concerns have led to its phase-out in chemical toilets. Formaldehyde is very irritating to the eyes, ears, skin, nose, and throat, and in addition to vapor inhalation, the chemical solution can splash back onto the buttocks of the user when their excrement drops in. Formaldehyde is also highly toxic to aquatic life and can be difficult for wastewater treatment plants to dispose of safely.

In modern toilets, microbial and enzymatic agents are increasingly common. These effectively reduce odor by accelerating digestion and breakdown of the waste, without relying on toxic additives or concealment with fragrances alone. Some can also break down toilet paper as well.

All of the above ingredients may have a limited lifespan (e.g., 7 days), requiring frequent replacement to maintain efficacy.

A much older form of portable toilet chemical is lye. Lye was used during the old "wooden outhouse days" to prevent odors. After a person is done using the portable toilet they would sprinkle a bit of lye into the holding tank. Lye can be dangerously corrosive to skin, and is rarely used today.

Locations

They are frequently seen at outdoor work sites, particularly construction sites, farms, ranches, camp sites and large banks of dozens of portable toilets allow for ready sanitation at large gatherings such as outdoor music festivals. Several portable toilets arranged in these large banks are referred to as a 'sitting' of portable toilets.

Market size
In the United States, the chemical toilet industry is a $2 billion a year business with the standard model renting for $225 per day and luxury restroom trailer units with flushing toilets going for a few thousand each day.

Variations

Newer models include toilet paper and, occasionally, antibacterial hand sanitizer dispensers. It has become common for portable toilets to be paired with a separate hand washing station. These sink stations provide a foot pump to dispense non-potable water to wash one's hands with provided soap dispensers or hand sanitizer stations after using the toilet, along with paper toweling.

Another common pairing are portable toilets on trailers known commonly as a "toilet trailer". These trailers are typically found in 1–2 toilet configurations with a hand wash ability using either a hand washing station or a plastic barrel full of water. These trailers are often seen on agricultural fields or at road construction sites. These restrooms are ideal for situations where the workers (users) are very mobile. However, this configuration has proven problematic; most modern portable toilet waste tank designs have proven inadequate to deal with the common problem of splash-outs from the waste holding tank while being towed down bumpy roads. Also, when being towed, the high winds blow in from the vents, creating a hurricane effect inside and ejecting any toilet paper rolls from the portable toilet if not secured.

"Luxury" portable toilets also exist. They are typically mounted on large "office-like" trailers or made from converted shipping containers. They contain every amenity that a public toilet would have such as running water, flushing toilet, stalls, urinals, mirrors, lighting, and even air conditioning and hot water in some cases. However, these luxuries come at a price as these trailers typically cost multiple times more than a typical portable toilet to buy or rent. They are commonly found at weddings, high end events/charities, and movie shoots.

The chemical toilets used on film shoots are known as honeywagons.

Advantages
Though more expensive than a standard permanent outdoor latrine, portable toilets have several significant benefits mostly related to their portability; as they are self-contained, they can be placed almost anywhere. Portable toilets can be hauled in the back of pick-up trucks, and some corporations manufacture special trucks for this purpose.

Disadvantages
Because portable toilets are not plumbed, they keep the waste inside the tank; this can lead to a sewage smell if the portable toilet is not cleaned properly or is overused. They may also be seen as an eyesore in most communities, some of which prohibit the use of a portable toilet without special permission from the city or municipality.

Another disadvantage is that regular portable toilets are not wheelchair accessible, meaning that disabled people that use wheelchairs may find using portable toilets difficult or impossible. However, most modern companies offer wheel chair accessible portable toilets upon request.

Society and culture

Use in outdoor advertising
Portable toilets may be used to display outdoor advertising. Some advertisers wrap portable toilets with vinyl material similar to that commonly used on cars and buses.

History

The first US patent for a polyethylene plastic portable toilet was issued in the 1950s to Harvey Heather, the founder of United Sanitation. This "strong box" was a solid, molded, stand-alone chemical toilet. The second US patent for a polyethylene plastic portable toilet was in the 1960s to George Harding, a co-founder of PolyJohn Corporation with Ed Cooper and George Hiskes.

In the mid 1960s PolyJohn was importing these toilets in to the UK under the Portaloo name and by the early 1970s they realized they needed a UK manufacturer of chemicals for their toilets. Working in partnership with Doug Holt & Robert Frazer, the owners of Repclif Chemical Services Ltd now Qualkem Ltd, the Destrol brand was born. Destrol quickly became the main brand with product being sold across the globe, servicing toilets with Destrol Bio-Concentrate & Destrol 6.

Its predecessors include the Victorian thunderbox, the bucket toilet and the pit latrine. The shape of the structure resembles a privy (outhouse), but there is no hole dug beneath it.

See also
 Bucket toilet
 Composting toilet
 Pollee, a portable urinal for females
 Sanitation

References

Toilet types